The Millington-Memphis Airport  (formerly known as Millington Municipal Airport or Millington Regional Jetport) is a public airport in the city of Millington, Tennessee, in Shelby County, United States. It was historically known as Naval Air Station Memphis, and it still provides support to military aircraft visiting the adjacent Naval Support Activity Mid-South.

Facilities 
 Runway 4/22: 8,000 x . (2,438 x 61 m), surface: asphalt/concrete

Millington-Memphis Airport is home to two flight schools, CTI Professional Flight Training and the Memphis Navy Flying Club. CTI also offers a full-service FBO (CTI Aviation Services) with full-service JetA and full- and self-service AvGas.

History 
Military aviation first came to Memphis during World War I when the US Army leased  from the Memphis Chamber of Commerce. The Army established Park Field for flight training on November 26, 1907. The US Government purchased the property in 1920. Two years later, the Army closed the base.  

For the next 20 years, the government used the property for various purposes, and for a time leased the airfield to a flying service. After the start of WWII, the Navy took over the property and bought an additional  for an air station and a technical training school. The Navy utilized the air station the entire war for primary training with an ultimate total of 350 N2S Stearmans. A total of 16 outlying fields were established for flight training, some of which were hard surfaced and are in evidence today.

During the postwar period of the mid-1940s through the mid-1990s, NAS Memphis hosted numerous locally based Naval Air Reserve and Marine Air Reserve flying squadrons, as well as a major naval air technical training center (NATTC Millington) that provided the bulk of enlisted aviation specialty training for the US Navy and Marine Corps. Naval flight training returned to Memphis during the 1950s when single engine jet training was conducted with the Navy version of the Lockheed T-33 by Advanced Training Units (ATU) 105 and 205.

The 1993 Base Realignment and Closure Commission report resulted in significant changes to the base's mission and its redesignation in 1995 as Naval Support Activity Memphis. The airfield and flight line were turned over to the city of Millington, which is now the Millington-Memphis Airport.

In 1998, the name of the remaining naval base (that is, non-airfield) was changed to the Naval Support Activity Mid-South to better reflect its current mission and the Navy's approach to regionalization. The base hosts many tenant organizations, notably the Commander, Navy Personnel Command and the Bureau of Naval Personnel.

On December 9, 2008, a Mitsubishi MU-2 crash-landed during an emergency landing.

References

Sources

Airport Master Record (FAA Form 5010), also available as a printable form 
Millington-Memphis Airport (official website)

External links 

Millington Municipal Airport (bartcampbell.com, as of September 16, 2001)

Airports in Tennessee
Buildings and structures in Shelby County, Tennessee
Transportation in Shelby County, Tennessee
Transportation in Memphis, Tennessee